Robert "Bob" Bolitho (born July 20, 1952, in Victoria, British Columbia, Canada) is a former Canadian national team, North American Soccer League and Canadian Soccer League player. He is of Cornish descent.

Club career
Bolitho played as a teenager of Pacific Coast Soccer League side Victoria O'Keefe S.C. before joining the soccer team of the London Boxing Club in Victoria, for whom he won a Canadian Club Championship national title in 1975. The following summer Bolitho joined the Vancouver Whitecaps and remained with the club until 1980.  He was a member of their Soccer Bowl winning team in 1979, playing at right back in the Soccer Bowl win over the Tampa Bay Rowdies.  He went on loan to the Los Angeles Aztecs during the 1979–1980 NASL indoor season. In 1980, Bolitho began the season with the Whitecaps before being traded to the Tulsa Roughnecks with whom he played the rest of the 1980 outdoor as well as the 1980–1981 NASL indoor season.  In 1981, he moved to the Fort Lauderdale Strikers.  In 1984, the Strikers moved to Minnesota where they became the Minnesota Strikers. He began as a starter that season, but soon moved to the substitutes bench before being traded to the Tampa Bay Rowdies.  Bolitho then played one season for Victoria Vistas in the CSL in 1989.

International career
Bolitho was on the Canadian squad at the 1975 Pan American Games and was a member of the Olympic team at the 1976 Summer Olympics, playing against the Soviet Union in Montreal and North Korea in Toronto. He played a defensive midfield role in the early days of his first class career before settling down at right back. Bolitho scored an impressive equalizing goal against the United States in Vancouver in 1976 in a World Cup qualifier and scored again later that year in a 3–0 win over the US in a playoff in Port-au-Prince, Haiti, which allowed Canada to advance to the final round in 1978 World Cup qualifying.

International goals
Scores and results list Canada's goal tally first.

References

External links
 / Canada Soccer Hall of Fame
www.pcsl.org
 NASL stats
 Tampa Bay Rowdies: Bob Bolitho

1952 births
Living people
Canadian expatriate sportspeople in the United States
Canadian expatriate soccer players
Canada men's international soccer players
Canadian people of Cornish descent
Canada Soccer Hall of Fame inductees
Canadian Soccer League (1987–1992) players
Canadian soccer players
Olympic soccer players of Canada
Footballers at the 1976 Summer Olympics
Pan American Games competitors for Canada
Footballers at the 1975 Pan American Games
Expatriate soccer players in the United States
Association football defenders
Association football midfielders
Fort Lauderdale Strikers (1977–1983) players
Los Angeles Aztecs players
Minnesota Strikers (NASL) players
North American Soccer League (1968–1984) indoor players
North American Soccer League (1968–1984) players
Soccer players from Victoria, British Columbia
Tampa Bay Rowdies (1975–1993) players
Tulsa Roughnecks (1978–1984) players
Vancouver Whitecaps (1974–1984) players
Victoria Vistas players